University College of Engineering Arni, a constituent college of Anna university, was founded in 2009 at Thatchur located near to Arani, town of Thiruvannamalai District. The total annual intake for first year UG programme is 300 seats.

Departments
 Mechanical Engineering
 Computer Science and Engineering
 Electronics and Communication Engineering
 Electrical and Electronics Engineering
 Science and Humanities

References

Engineering colleges in Tamil Nadu
Education in Tiruvannamalai district
2008 establishments in Tamil Nadu